Soma (1992, sometimes spelled SoMa) was the second collaborative album by the U.S. ambient musicians Steve Roach and Robert Rich, following their 1990 album Strata.

Overview
The liner notes explain that the word soma can be found in the ancient Vedic texts describing a drink made from plants to help commune with the gods (a botanical hallucinogen), and that the same word meant "body" in Ancient Greek.

The music on the album is electronic and ambient music with psychedelic overtones. The album ends with a gentle, serene piece for electric guitar titled "Touch".

The album reached number nine on the Billboard New Age chart for April 17, 1993.

Track listing
 "Love Magick" – 7:40
 "Nightshade" – 9:07
 "Going Inland" – 4:05
 "Silk Ridge" – 6:05
 "Blood Music" – 8:10
 "Soma" – 12:07
 "Seduction of the Minotaur" – 5:21
 "Touch" – 4:36
All compositions by Steve Roach and Robert Rich.

Personnel
Musical
 Steve Roach – synthesizers, samplers, drum programming, didgeridu, voice, clay water pots, rainstick, rocks, various percussions, Lakota Indian flute, ocarinas, "glurp"
 Robert Rich – synthesizers, samplers, bamboo and clay flutes, steel guitar, drum programming, Udu clay drums, dumbek, ceramic talking drum, Waterphone, kalimba, rainstick, various percussions, "glurp"
 with
 Linda Kohanov – frame drum "cries, swirls and scratches" (on tracks 6 and 7)

Technical
 Production, recording, mixing: Steve Roach, Robert Rich
 Mastering: Stephen Hill, Robert Rich

Graphical
 Design, image editing, montage: Stephen Hill
 Cover: photochemical etching by Wernher Krutein (of Photovault, San Francisco)
 Artist photo: Chuck Koesters

References

Sources
 Roach, Steve & Rich, Robert (1992). "CD liner notes" in Soma, San Francisco: Hearts of Space Records, 1992, SKU HS11033-2, EAN 0025041103329 (UPC 025041103329)

External links
 Soma at SteveRoach.com
 Soma at RobertRich.com
 Soma at Hearts of Space Records
 Soma at Hearts of Space
 

1992 albums
Robert Rich (musician) albums
Steve Roach (musician) albums
Hearts of Space Records albums
Collaborative albums